The Eau Jaune Lake (English: Yellow Water Lake) is a freshwater body of the Eeyou Istchee Baie-James, in Jamésie, in the administrative region of Nord-du-Québec, province of Quebec, in Canada. This lake extends entirely into the townships of Brongniart and Rasles.

Forestry is the main economic activity of the sector. Recreational tourism activities come second.

The Eastern part of the "Eau Jaune Lake" hydrographic slope is accessible by a forest road from the North separating from route 113 which runs East-West to the North of the lake along the Canadian National Railway.

The surface of the "Eau Jaune Lake" is usually frozen from early November to mid-May, however, safe ice circulation is generally from mid-November to mid-April.

Geography

Toponymy
This hydronym was reported in 1916 in minutes of the Quebec Geography Commission. Presumably, this descriptive toponym borrows its name from the color of water. In 1900, explorer Henry O'Sullivan, who mapped this lake without naming it, indicated that the surrounding soil contained ferrous deposits.

The toponym "Lac à l'Eau Jaune" was officialized on December 5, 1968 by the Commission de toponymie du Québec during its creation.

Notes and references

See also 

Eeyou Istchee James Bay
Lakes of Nord-du-Québec
Nottaway River drainage basin